Enzo Siviero (born 19 January 1945) is an Italian engineer, academic, writer. and also architect, as he received an honoris causa academic degree in architecture from the Polytechnic of Bari in 2009 at the age of 64.

Biography

In December 2016, at TUNeIT in Tunis he presented a 140 km bridge that would connect the Tunisian peninsula of Cape Bon (Africa) to Mazara del Vallo in Sicily (Europe). He is the rector of the Università degli Studi eCampus in Padua.

Strait of Messina Bridge

Academic and engineer, Enzo Siviero is an expert of bridges. Always a supporter of the usefulness of the construction of the Strait of Messina Bridge, he has held several conferences and lectures in order to convince skeptics of the importance of this work.

On 22 April 2021 participated with the CEO of Webuild, Pietro Salini, in Catania in a joint press conference with the President of the Sicilian Region Nello Musumeci and Calabria Region Antonino Spirlì, announced that he was ready to build the Strait of Messina Bridge, starting immediately with the works and on the basis of the executive project and construction site approved definitively in 2013. He declared that he already had the 4 billion euro coverage necessary for the construction of the Work and that he could obtain the other two necessary for the infrastructures connected to it from private financing.
|

Books
Professor Enzo Sivier has written more than a dozen books, the most important hereinafter, most often dealing with the theme of bridges.

See also
 Università degli Studi eCampus

References

External links 
 Enzo Siviero at Ingenio 
 Un ponte tra Sicilia e Tunisia, il sogno di Enzo Siviero  

1945 births
Living people
Italian academics
21st-century Italian architects
21st-century Italian engineers
21st-century Italian writers
People from the Province of Padua